Polistes olivaceus, also known as the yellow oriental paper wasp or Macao paper wasp, is a species of paper wasp. In the Cook Islands, it is known in English simply as the yellow paper wasp, while its Cook Island Maori name is "Rango Patia" or other variation depending on the island.

Distribution 
It is native to India and East Asia, but also introduced to East Africa, and Pacific island nations such as the Marquesas Islands, Easter Island, Hawaii, and the Cook Islands, in the South Pacific.

Notes

References

Insects of India
olivaceus
Insects described in 1773
Taxa named by Charles De Geer